Meteoalarm is a website developed by EUMETNET, a network of European states' national meteorological services, providing severe weather warnings. Maps are used to show where and which type of dangerous weather events are forecasted to occur within the next 24 or 48 hours. The level of risk is colour-coded, based on likely damage, disruption and danger, and displayed for each region of each country.

Pictograms and colour-coding is used to convey meaning regardless of the user's language. Strong winds, torrential rain, snow and ice, thunderstorms, and extreme temperatures are indicated, as well as weather conditions that could lead to increased risk, such as storm surges and high waves, forest fires and avalanches. Behind the pictograms there is a link to the current warnings. More detailed information is provided on the websites of national weather services.

Colour coding
There are four colours to point out the weather conditions in a certain European country: green, yellow, orange and red.

Green - No dangerous weather is expected.
Yellow - The weather is potentially dangerous, but unlikely to be extreme. Care is called for in activities that are dependent on the weather.
Orange - There is severe weather that may cause damage or accidents. People are advised to take care, keep abreast of the latest developments in the weather, and take heed of advice given by the authorities.
Red - Great danger is expected from extremely severe weather. Major damage and accidents are likely, in many cases with threat to life, over a wide area. People are advised to be extremely careful, pay close attention to bulletins and obey the instructions and advice given by the authorities. Exceptional safety measures may be taken.

A greyscale map is available for colour-blind users.

Member countries
Meteoalarm.org is developed by EUMETNET, the network of public European weather services who are members of the World Meteorological Organization (WMO). The weather service of Austria (Zentral Anstalt für Meteorologie und Geodynamik) is the responsible member for this project and does the technical realisation. The Dutch public weather service KNMI (Koninklijk Nederlands Meteorologisch Instituut) gave close support. This project is officially called the European Multiservice Meteorological Awareness Project or EMMA-project.

The member countries of Meteoalarm are: Austria, Belgium, Bosnia and Herzegovina, Bulgaria, Czech Republic, Croatia, Cyprus, Denmark, Estonia, Finland, France, Germany, Greece, Hungary, Iceland, Ireland, Italy, Latvia, Lithuania, Luxembourg, Malta, Republic of Moldova, Montenegro, Netherlands, Norway, Poland, Portugal, Romania, Serbia, Slovakia, Slovenia, Spain, Sweden, Switzerland, and United Kingdom.

Award
The EMMA-project received in October 2008 the EMS (European Meteorological Society) Outreach & Communication Award for the website www.meteoalarm.org. The panel thought that this project was an excellent example of putting a bridge between weather services, science and society.

Usage and future developments
The daily access rates reach 12 million per day during warning situations.
In the future the website will be expanding. Probably more countries will be participating. It is foreseen to connect with information providers and to disseminate weather warnings through SMS and email. A feedback feature with the possibility to present photographs from users might be a further step.

See also
EUMETNET

References and links

 
 EUMETNET, network of 24 National European Meteorological Services
 Royal Netherlands Meteorological Institute (KNMI) in the Netherlands
 World Meteorological Organization (WMO) in Geneve, Switzerland

European websites
Meteorological data and networks
Weather events in Europe